Lasthenia maritima is a species of flowering plant in the family Asteraceae known by the common names maritime goldfields and seaside goldfields.

Distribution
It is native to the coastline of western North America, where it is found almost exclusively on small rocky, coastal islands in the Pacific Ocean between Vancouver Island in British Columbia to the Farallon Islands off the coast of the San Francisco Bay Area in California.

This species probably evolved from Lasthenia minor, and it is adapted to the unique conditions on these maritime islands: high winds, saline sea spray, and thin soils that are often disturbed by the activities of the seabirds that roost and nest on these rocks and made acidic and nitrogen-rich from their droppings.

Though limited in distribution, this is one of the more common plants on the Farallon Islands of California, where it is an important part of the ecology of seabirds and where it is locally known as Farallon weed.

Description
Lasthenia maritima is an annual herb with short, decumbent to prostrate stems lined with fleshy lobed or unlobed leaves up to 9 centimeters long.

The inflorescence bears flower heads lined with hairy phyllaries and ringed with 7 to 12 gold ray florets each about 3 millimeters long.

The fruit is a small, hairy achene often topped with a brownish pappus.

References

External links

Jepson Manual Treatment
USDA Plants Profile
Photo gallery

maritima
Flora of California
Flora of Oregon
Flora of Washington (state)
Flora of British Columbia
Flora of the West Coast of the United States
Flora without expected TNC conservation status